"Backstage Lensman" is a short story by Randall Garrett, a parody or pastiche of the Lensman series of E.E. 'Doc' Smith. It was first written in 1949, lost and then rewritten in 1978.

Garrett claimed that "Doc read the first version of 'Backstage Lensman' and laughed all through the convention. It was his suggestion that I call the spaceship Dentless rather than Dauntless."

Publication history
This story appeared in:
 The magazine Analog, June 1978
 Takeoff, a collection of short fiction and poems by Randall Garrett, 1980
 Shaggy B.E.M. Stories, an anthology edited by Mike Resnick, 1988

External links

1949 short stories
1978 short stories
Science fiction short stories
Parodies of literature
Lensman series
Short stories by Randall Garrett
Works originally published in Analog Science Fiction and Fact